Mahadai Das was a Guyanese poet. She was born in Eccles, East Bank Demerara, Guyana, in 1954. She wrote poetry from her early school days at The Bishops' High School, Georgetown. She did her first degree at the University of Guyana and received her B.A. in philosophy at Columbia University, New York, and then began a doctoral programme in Philosophy at the University of Chicago. Das became very ill and was never able to complete the programme.

Background 
She was a dancer, actress, teacher and beauty queen (Ms. Dewali, 1971), served as a volunteer member of the Guyana National Service around 1976 and was part of the Messenger Group promoting ‘Coolie’ art forms at a time when Indo-Guyanese culture was virtually excluded from national life. She was one of the first Indo-Caribbean women to be published. Her poetry explicitly relates to ethnic identity, something which contrasts her with other female Indo Caribbean poets. Another theme in her writing is the working conditions in the Caribbean islands. Das's A Leaf in His Ear was included in an article on "10 Female Caribbean Authors You Should Know". One of Das's last published work of poetry was named "bones"  and was published in 1988 by the Peepal Press of London.

Guyana faced big social and political problems dealing with corrupt and unfair laws and government. Das tried to find ways to solve these issues and was a part of the Working People's Alliance whose goal, like Das's, was to find resolutions to the number of problems Guyana faced on a daily basis regarding politics and social issues.

Death 
Das died April 3, 2003 in Barbados, from an illness relating to cardiac arrest which was suffered 10 days before her death.

Themes 
There are a few reoccurring themes in many of Das's writings including the very poor and unfair working conditions that many Caribbean people sadly have to endure for their entire life. In addition to poor working conditions, another reoccurring themes in Das's writings have to do with is ethnic identity and people finding who they really are and coming to terms with who they are despite all the negativity coming from outside Europeans. These themes, although reoccurring in Das's many writings and poems, also tend to be the theme of a majority of Caribbean authors.

 Bones (Peepal Tree Press Ltd., 1988)
 A Leaf in His Ear: Selected Poems (Peepal Tree Press Ltd., 2010)

Several of her poems were included in The Heinemann Book of Caribbean Poetry (Heinemann, 1992).

References

Guyanese writers
Guyanese poets
Indo-Guyanese people
Guyanese women writers
1954 births
2003 deaths
University of Guyana alumni
Columbia College (New York) alumni
University of Chicago alumni
Guyanese women poets
20th-century poets
20th-century women writers